Nordvågen is a small fishing village in Nordkapp Municipality in Troms og Finnmark county, Norway. The village has a fish processing plant.

References

External links

Villages in Finnmark
Populated places of Arctic Norway
Magerøya
Nordkapp